Porcupine grass is a common name for several grasses and may refer to:

Miscanthus sinensis, native to eastern Asia
Stipa spartea (Hesperostipa spartea)
Triodia species
 Triodia scariosa